Alexandre Torres Simoni (born 2 July 1979) is a retired professional Brazilian tennis player. After being ranked as high as No. 23 in the ITF World Junior Ranking, he turned professional in 1997.

On the ATP tour, his best results were in 2001, when he reached two semifinals: in Bogotá and Salvador. He also reached his career-high ranking of No. 96. He was also a member of the Brazilian Davis Cup team, having participated in a total of four ties from 2001 to 2004 and collecting a 2–3 Win/Loss record.

Simoni played his last official match in January 2008, and nowadays works as a tennis coach in São Paulo.

Titles

Singles (3)

Doubles (9)

Runners-up (16)

Singles (4)

Doubles (12)

References

External links

1979 births
Living people
Brazilian male tennis players
Tennis players from São Paulo